The men's mass start race of the 2015–16 ISU Speed Skating World Cup 2, arranged in the Utah Olympic Oval, in Salt Lake City, United States, was held on November 22, 2015.

Arjan Stroetinga of the Netherlands won the race, while Fabio Francolini of Italy came second, and Bart Swings of Belgium came third. Joey Mantia of the United States won the Division B race.

Results

The race took place on Sunday, November 22, with Division B scheduled in the morning session, at 11:13, and Division B scheduled in the afternoon session, at 14:45.

Division A

Division B

References

Men mass start
2